Kosmos 261 ( meaning Cosmos 261), also known as DS-U2-GK No.1, was a Soviet satellite which was launched in 1968 as part of the Dnepropetrovsk Sputnik programme. It was a  spacecraft, which was built by the Yuzhnoye Design Bureau, and was used to study the density of air in the upper atmosphere, and investigate aurorae. Kosmos 261 set the way for the Intercosmos Program. Hungary, Poland, Romania, Czechoslovakia, DDR and Bulgaria were the six Soviet Bloc countries that collaborated in the experiments on board the satellite.

A Kosmos-2I 63SM carrier rocket was used to launch Kosmos 261 into low Earth orbit from Site 133/1 at the Plesetsk Cosmodrome. The launch occurred at 23:55:00 UTC on 19 December 1968, and resulted in the successful insertion of the satellite into orbit. Upon reaching orbit, the satellite was assigned its Kosmos designation, and received the International Designator 1968-117A. The North American Aerospace Defense Command assigned it the catalogue number 03624.

Kosmos 261 was the first of two DS-U2-GK satellites to be launched. It decayed from orbit and reentered the atmosphere on 12 February 1969.

See also

1968 in spaceflight

References

Spacecraft launched in 1968
Kosmos satellites
Dnepropetrovsk Sputnik program